Albertslund Municipality has in its history been a strong area for parties of the red bloc. In the 2019 Danish general election, it would become the municipality where the bloc received the 2nd highest % of votes. Ever since 1947 the Social Democrats had also held the mayor's position.

In the 2017 election, the Social Democrats had won 9 seats, and become the largest party. They would also secure the mayor's position. 

In this election, the Social Democrats would lose 2 seats. The Green Left would on the other hand gain 2 seats, and this would create some dramatic post-election negotitations. At first Vivi Nør Jacobsen from the Green Left announced that her party along with the Social Democrats and Danish Social Liberal Party had reached an agreement that would see her becoming the new mayor.  However, the parties outside the agreement, namely the Conservatives, the Danish People's Party, Venstre and the Red–Green Alliance in response, shockingly had decided to support the continuation of Steen Christiansen as mayor. The Social Democrats would eventually accept the offer from the parties, and Steen Christiansen would continue for a fourth term.

Electoral system
For elections to Danish municipalities, a number varying from 9 to 31 are chosen to be elected to the municipal council. The seats are then allocated using the D'Hondt method and a closed list proportional representation.
Albertslund Municipality had 21 seats in 2021

Unlike in Danish General Elections, in elections to municipal councils, electoral alliances are allowed.

Electoral alliances  

Electoral Alliance 1

Electoral Alliance 2

Results

Notes

References 

Albertslund